Abdelmalek Belghiti (1906 in Fes – 2010) was a writer who has been called the prince of the poets of Morocco in the 1950s. He published several collections of poetry, a.o. Al Manar et Rah Al Arouah. An anthology of all his poems was published in 1947. He received several literary prizes. Many of his poems were dedicated to the struggle for the independence of Morocco, like his poems about the protest against the Berber Dahir, the bloody suppression following the manifest of independence in 1944 and the deportation of sultan Mohammed V. Abdelmalek was a son of the well known cadi, scholar and poet Abou Abbas Ahmed ben Mahmoun Belghiti (1865- 1929).

References

20th-century Moroccan poets
1906 births
2010 deaths
People from Fez, Morocco
20th-century poets
21st-century Moroccan poets